Solliès-Pont is a commune in the Var department in the Provence-Alpes-Côte d'Azur region in southeastern France.

It was the first location of the 1995 Éric Borel spree killings.

Population

In popular culture 
Solliès-Pont is the setting of Vladimir Nabokov's 1923 Russian-language poem “Прованс” ("Provence").  The original poem and its English translation by the author were set to music by composers Ivan Barbotin and James DeMars as part of the song cycle "Sing, Poetry" on the 2011 contemporary classical album Troika.

See also
Communes of the Var department

References

Communes of Var (department)